Aslaug Høydal (22 December 1916 – 20 July 2007) was a Norwegian schoolteacher, novelist, poet and children's writer.

She was born in Seljord. Among her novels are Dyr last from 1963, Tårer i sand from 1969, and Brest i såldet from 1973. Her children's books include Born og bøling from 1950, Bak berg og blåne from 1965, and Heile klassa i sving from 1970. Other works are the short story collection I skotlina from 1970, and the poetry collection Skjelv i vindovne skogar from 1986. She was awarded the Melsom Prize in 1964.

References

1916 births
2007 deaths
People from Seljord
Norwegian children's writers
Norwegian women children's writers
20th-century Norwegian novelists
20th-century Norwegian poets
Norwegian women novelists
Norwegian women poets
Norwegian schoolteachers
20th-century Norwegian women writers